Paramythia is a genus of berrypecker in the family Paramythiidae.

Species
It contains the following species:

References

 
Bird genera
Taxa named by Charles Walter De Vis